Andrew J. Lally (born February 11, 1975) is an American professional auto racing driver. He competes full-time in the WeatherTech SportsCar Championship, driving the Audi R8 for Magnus Racing and previously part-time in the NASCAR Cup Series, driving the No. 78 Ford Mustang for Live Fast Motorsports and part-time in the NASCAR Xfinity Series, driving the No. 44 Chevrolet Camaro for Alpha Prime Racing.

Racing career
Although Lally won the 2011 Monster Energy NASCAR Cup Series Rookie of the Year, he is best known for his road racing expertise in the Grand-Am Rolex Sports Car Series (Now IMSA WeatherTech SportsCar Championship) as well as the American Le Mans Series. In May 2010 Andy became only the second driver in the history of the Grand-Am Rolex Series to make 100 starts, winning at Virginia International Raceway on April 24, 2010. In January 2012 Andy extended and broke records in the Grand-Am Rolex Series by winning his fourth Rolex 24 Hours of Daytona in the GT class. Lally won his fifth class victory at Daytona International Speedway on January 31, 2016, tying him for fourth on the all-time win list at the Rolex 24 Hours of Daytona. 

In 2017, after 5 years of being with Magnus Racing, Lally signed with Acura and Michael Shank Racing to debut the brand new 2017 Acura NSX. Lally teamed with Katherine Legge and together they scored the first and second win worldwide for the brand at the Detroit Grand Prix and Watkins Glen International. Lally also scored the first pole position for the car worldwide at Watkins Glen for the 6 Hours of Watkins Glen.

For 2018 Lally, re-joined Magnus Racing in an Audi R8 LMS and will start the season at The Rolex 24 at Daytona.

Lally has scored three top10 finishes in his last four starts in the NASCAR Xfinity Series with a 5th-place finish at the 2017 Mid-Ohio Sports Car Course race being a career-best. 

Lally owns Grand Am records for most GT wins, most podiums, and most top-five finishes in Rolex Series history.  

He began his career in karting, culminating with 2 WKA National Gold Cup Championships. Lally first got into sports car racing in 1993 with his first sponsor Tyrolean Motors with car owner Walter Simendinger running SCCA regional events. In 1997 Lally won the US F2000 Rookie of the Year in his first full year in a professional series.

Road racing

Lally is a three-time Grand-Am Rolex Series Champion. He holds series records for most all-time top 3 and top 5 finishes and leads the all-time GT class win list with 26 victories. In January 2011 Lally won the 24 Hours of Daytona in the GT class, giving him the record for most consecutive Grand-Am Rolex seasons with at least one victory (8), spanning from 2004 to 2011. In January 2011 Lally finished first place in the GT class in the 24 Hours of Daytona giving him the most podium finishes of any driver at the famed 24 race (7) since the Grand-Am Rolex series started in 2000. His victory at Daytona International Speedway on January 29, 2011, made him the all-time winningest GT driver in the Grand-Am Series. 

On May 13, 2012, racing with the Magnus Racing team in the No. 44, Lally yet again made history in sports car racing as he became the first driver in Grand-Am history to achieve his 100th podium finish at New Jersey Motorsports Park as he and his teammate John Potter finished the race in 3rd place. Lally scored podium 101 when he and Potter went on to win the first-ever endurance sports car race at the famed Indianapolis Motor Speedway on July 7, 2012, which also locked up the 2012 North American Endurance Championship. His prototype results include a 1st in class at the Rolex 24 Hours of Daytona, 2nd in class at the Petit Le Mans, 3rd in Class at the 24 Hours of Le Mans and a 2nd overall and in class at the 2008 12 Hours of Sebring.

NASCAR

In 2007, Lally made his NASCAR debut in both the Busch Series (now NASCAR Xfinity Series) and the NASCAR Craftsman Truck Series (now NASCAR Gander Outdoors Truck Series). Lally had one top ten finish in two starts with the No. 47 Wood Brothers/JTG Racing Ford Fusion and made three starts in the Truck Series with TRG Motorsports, driving the No. 00 Toyota Tundra.

Lally raced in the Inaugural ARCA Racing Series Loud Energy Drink 150 at New Jersey Motorsports Park in September 2008. He was fastest in every practice session, started on the pole, and led the most laps, but lost the race on pit strategy when the race was called due to weather with eventual series champion Justin Allgaier winning the race. In 2009, he started 15th driving the No. 71 Chevrolet for TRG in the NASCAR Sprint Cup Series at Watkins Glen International. He ran as a teammate to David Gilliland, the usual driver of the No. 71, who unsuccessfully attempted to qualify in the No. 70. Lally finished a respectable 27th in his first Cup start after being involved in a crash with Sam Hornish Jr., Jeff Gordon and Jeff Burton. 

In 2010, Lally ran seven races for TRG, finishing 18th at Watkins Glen. On February 17, 2011, he filed paperwork to run the full Sprint Cup season and campaign for series Rookie of the Year honors (A driver may maintain his rookie eligibility provided he runs seven or fewer races in a season before declaring).

Running the full 2011 season for TRG in the No. 71 and No. 77 cars, Lally clinched the 2011 Rookie of the Year honor in early September, his competitors for the honor, Brian Keselowski and T. J. Bell, having failed to make the minimum number of starts in the series to be eligible for the award.

In 2014, Lally made a return to the Nationwide Series at Road America to race the No. 55 for Bobby Dotter. Lally qualified 10th and finished 7th.

2015 saw Lally run a partial schedule in the Xfinity Series in the No. 90 for King Autosport while maintaining his full-time ride with Magnus Racing in the No. 44 Porsche in the IMSA Series. In 2016 Lally would return to the Xfinity Series at Mid Ohio driving the No. 90 in place of Mario Gosselin. It was a wet and rainy race where cars were sliding all over the place, going off the track, and spinning out. Lally was running well and then was hit from behind and spun in a multi-car accident with Brendan Gaughan and Erik Jones. Lally would recover and finish 7th, getting his third top ten in the Xfinity series. His fourth top ten finish would come in August 2017, again at Mid Ohio in his only start of the season and placing 5th. This was the best result of any driver only making one race start in 2017. Lally plans on running at least 3 races for 2018 in the NASCAR Xfinity Series.

After not running any of the Xfinity Series road course races in 2019, Lally returned to the series for 2020, driving the No. 02 for Our Motorsports. Full-time Truck Series driver Brett Moffitt, the usual driver of that car, could not participate in both races as he was at Michigan for the Truck Series race on the same weekend as Road America, and due to NASCAR's rule only allowing drivers to compete in one race at the Daytona Road Course, Moffitt could not run that race either.

Lally returned to Our Motorsports in 2021 to run some of the Xfinity Series road course races beginning at the Daytona Road Course, now in February the week after the Daytona 300 as the second race of the season. That year, Moffitt joined the team full-time in the No. 02, and the team added a second full-time car, the No. 23, which Lally made his starts in. Lally was initially going to drive the No. 03 for Our for the Super Start Batteries 188, but the car failed to qualify due to lack of qualifying and not being high enough in owner points, after not showing up for the inaugural race of the season, the Daytona 300. He would then transfer over to the No. 99 B. J. McLeod Motorsports ride, finishing 31st a lap down. He attempted the next seven races in the 03 but it was no use as the car was not high enough in owner points to make the field. In the Pit Boss 250, Lally would race Our's No. 23, as the 23 was locked into the field on owners points. Lally started 13th and finished 18th. Lally also attempted the next road course race, the B&L Transport 170, in the 23. He was running 4th on the closing lap when right in front of him, Riley Herbst wrecked Miguel Paludo down the straightaway. As Herbst had made contact with Lally coming to the white flag, Lally likely retaliated by wrecking Herbst. As he wrecked the 98, Brandon Jones passed him, leading him to finish 5th, tying his best career finish which he also scored at: Henry 180 in 2020, UNOH 188 in 2020, and the Mid-Ohio Challenge in 2017. In the 2021 edition of the Henry 180 at Road America, Natalie Decker was in the No. 23, and Lally returned to B. J. McLeod Motorsports. except this time driving the No. 5 with Alpha Prime sponsorship. Lally dodged chaos at the end of the race to finish 13th. After not attempting the Skrewball Peanut Butter Whiskey 200 at the Glen, the first road course race he did not attempt this year, Lally returned at the Pennzoil 150 again driving for McLeod, this time returning to the No. 78. Lally, partially due to strategy at the end of stage 2, finished fifth in that stage. Lally ended up finishing tenth, his best finish this year with McLeod. Lally then unexpectedly replaced Kyle Tilley in the Cup race there, who was also driving the No. 78 for McLeod. This was his first race in the NASCAR Cup Series since 2011.

In 2021, Lally was initially announced to drive all 6 road course races for Alpha Prime Racing in their number 44 car for the 2022 Xfinity Series Season. However, in January 2022, the team announced they had mutually parted ways with Lally.

Sports car racing

After winning Sunoco Rookie of the Year in the Sprint Cup Series, Lally returned to sports car racing for the 2012 season with 30 races planned across three series. He drove in the Grand-Am Road Racing Rolex Sports Car Series for Magnus Racing in the GT class, as well as a partial schedule in the ALMS and full schedule in the Continental Tire Series.

Lally won the 2012 24 Hours of Daytona GT division in a Magnus Racing Porsche 911 GT3 Cup with co-drivers Richard Lietz, Rene Rast and team owner John Potter. It marked Lally's fourth Rolex 24 class win and second consecutive. He won the 2016 24 Hours of Daytona in the GTD division once again with Magnus Racing for his 5th class win.

He joined Michael Shank Racing for the 2017 IMSA SportsCar Championship to drive an Acura NSX GT3.

Personal life
Outside of auto racing, Lally is a World Championship street luge racer. After being No. 1 qualifier in two classes Lally ended up winning the 2012 IGSA World Championships in both Street Luge and Classic Luge that took place in Calgary, Canada. In 2009 he was again No. 1 qualifier for both luge classes at the IGSA World Championships in Bathurst, Australia, and went on to his winning the World Championship in Classic luge and finish 2nd in Street Luge. Lally is a brown belt in Brazilian jiu-jitsu under Paul Creighton and an avid mountain biker who competes in cross-country mountain bike racing. In 2009 he was part of a four-man team that won the 24 Hours of Big Bear in the Men's Sport division.

He is a vegan. During a visit to Farm Sanctuary in August 2011, he was quoted as saying: "I do it for ethical reasons. By this point in human evolution, we should be smart enough and kind enough to live without torturing other living beings just so we can enjoy lunch, especially when there are so many other great tasting options available."

Motorsports career results

SCCA National Championship Runoffs

American open-wheel racing
(key) (Races in bold indicate pole position, races in italics indicate fastest race lap)

Barber Dodge Pro Series

Atlantic Championship

Sports car racing

IMSA WeatherTech SportsCar Championship results
(key)

† Points only counted towards the WeatherTech Sprint Cup and not the overall GTD Championship.
* Season still in progress
Notes
1 Disqualified for minimum ride height violation.

Grand-Am Rolex Sports Car Series results
(key)

24 Hours of Le Mans results

NASCAR
(key) (Bold – Pole position awarded by qualifying time. Italics – Pole position earned by points standings or practice time. * – Most laps led.)

Cup Series

Daytona 500

Xfinity Series

 Season still in progress

Camping World Truck Series

ARCA Re/Max Series
(key) (Bold – Pole position awarded by qualifying time. Italics – Pole position earned by points standings or practice time. * – Most laps led.)

References

External links

Official website

Living people
1975 births
People from Northport, New York
Racing drivers from New York (state)
24 Hours of Le Mans drivers
24 Hours of Daytona drivers
NASCAR drivers
American Le Mans Series drivers
Rolex Sports Car Series drivers
Atlantic Championship drivers
Formula Palmer Audi drivers
Formula Ford drivers
World Karting Association drivers
Barber Pro Series drivers
WeatherTech SportsCar Championship drivers
U.S. F2000 National Championship drivers
SCCA National Championship Runoffs participants
24H Series drivers
GT World Challenge America drivers
Meyer Shank Racing drivers
Michelin Pilot Challenge drivers